Sony BMG Music Entertainment Poland Sp. z o.o., was a Polish subsidiary of Sony BMG Music Entertainment. Label was founded in 2004 after BMG Poland merged with Sony Music Entertainment Poland. In 2008 after BMG was brought by Sony Music corporation Polish label returned to the previous name Sony Music Entertainment Poland.

Selected artists  
 
Andrzej Piaseczny 
Ania
Big Cyc 
Coma
Cool Kids of Death 
Ewelina Flinta
Hey
Kasia Cerekwicka
Kayah
Lady Pank
Maciej Silski
Makowiecki Band
Marcin Rozynek
Maria Sadowska
Maryla Rodowicz
Mietall Waluś
Monika Brodka 
Myslovitz
Nefer 
Renata Przemyk

See also
 EMI Music Poland
 PolyGram Poland
 Universal Music Poland
 Warner Music Poland

References

Polish record labels
Sony BMG